Joseph O'Rourke is the Spencer T. and Ann W. Olin Professor of Computer Science at Smith College and the founding chair of the Smith computer science department. His main research interest is computational geometry.

One of O'Rourke's early results was an algorithm for finding the minimum bounding box of a point set in three dimensions when the box is not required to be axis-aligned. The problem is made difficult by the fact that the optimal box may not share any of its face planes with the convex hull of the point set. Nevertheless, O'Rourke found an algorithm for this problem with running time .

In 1985, O'Rourke was the program chair of the first annual Symposium on Computational Geometry.  He was formerly the arXiv moderator for computational geometry and discrete mathematics.

In 2012 O'Rourke was named a Fellow of the Association for Computing Machinery.

Books
O'Rourke is the author or editor of:
 Art Gallery Theorems and Algorithms (1987). 
 Computational Geometry in C, 2nd Ed. (1998).  
 Handbook of Discrete and Computational Geometry, with Jacob E. Goodman and Csaba Tóth. 3rd Ed. (2017). 
 Geometric Folding Algorithms: Linkages, Origami, Polyhedra, with Erik D. Demaine (2007). 
  Discrete and Computational Geometry, with Satyan Devadoss (2011). . 
  How To Fold It: The Mathematics of Linkages, Origami, and Polyhedra (2011). . 
Pop-Up Geometry: The Mathematics behind Pop-Up Cards (2022). ISBN 978-009-09626-3.

References

External links
Home page

Year of birth missing (living people)
Living people
American computer scientists
Researchers in geometric algorithms
Smith College faculty
Fellows of the Association for Computing Machinery